Wabasca 166C is an Indian reserve of the Bigstone Cree Nation in Alberta, located within the Municipal District of Opportunity No. 17. In the 2016 Canadian Census, it recorded a population of 188 living in 47 of its 58 total private dwellings. The community is located along the northeast shore of North Wabasca Lake.

References

Indian reserves in Alberta